Rac2 (Ras-related C3 botulinum toxin substrate 2) is a small (~21 kDa) signaling G protein (to be specific, a GTPase), and is a member of the Rac subfamily of the family Rho family of GTPases. It is encoded by the gene RAC2.

Members of Rho family of GTPases appear to regulate a diverse array of cellular events, including the control of cell growth, cytoskeletal reorganization, and the activation of protein kinases.

Interactions 

Rac2 has been shown to interact with ARHGDIA and Nitric oxide synthase 2A.

See also 
 NADPH oxidase

References

Further reading

External links 
RAC2 Info with links in the Cell Migration Gateway